Simeon Slaveykov Aleksandrov (born 24 September 2003) is a Bulgarian footballer who plays as an attacking midfielder and winger for Septemvri Sofia on loan from CSKA Sofia.

Career
Born in Plovdiv, Aleksandrov started out at local Lokomotiv Plovdiv at the age of 8. Four years later, he joined Septemvri Sofia academy and was promoted to the first team in 2019. In the summer of 2022, the team won promotion to the First League. Aleksandrov made his debut in the top division on 8 July 2022 against Ludogorets Razgrad. On 18 July 2022, he scored his debut top level goal in a match against Hebar. After his good start of the 2022–23 season with Septemvri in First League, he moved to CSKA Sofia in the last day of transfer window.

Career statistics

Club

References

External links
 

2003 births
Living people
Bulgarian footballers
Bulgaria youth international footballers
FC Septemvri Sofia players
PFC CSKA Sofia players
First Professional Football League (Bulgaria) players
Association football midfielders